Tase railway station is a railway station located in Tase Subdistrict, Yala City, Yala.

2005 train bombings 
On 19 October 2005, separatists planted three 20 kg bombs under the railway tracks between Tase and Yala, around the 1036 km post. The bombs were planted at 20-metre intervals and exploded when a scheduled military train, No. 2071, was running towards Yala. Of the three bombs planted, only two bombs were ignited (ones at the front and back) of the train. No one was injured from the bombings and the train was carefully driven up to Yala railway station. The event was part of the South Thailand Insurgency.

Services 
 Local No. 447/448 Surat Thani-Sungai Kolok-Surat Thani
 Local No. 451/452 Nakhon Si Thammarat-Sungai Kolok-Nakhon Si Thammarat
 Local No. 455/456 Nakhon Si Thammarat-Yala-Nakhon Si Thammarat
 Local No. 463/464 Phatthalung-Sungai Kolok-Phatthalung

References 

 
 

Railway stations in Thailand